The 1967 European Figure Skating Championships were held in Ljubljana, Yugoslavia. Elite senior-level figure skaters from European ISU member nations competed for the title of European Champion in the disciplines of men's singles, ladies' singles, pair skating, and ice dancing.

Results

Men

Ladies

Pairs

Ice dancing

References

External links
 results

European Figure Skating Championships, 1967
European Figure Skating Championships, 1967
European Figure Skating Championships
International figure skating competitions hosted by Yugoslavia
European Figure Skating Championships
Sports competitions in Ljubljana
1960s in Ljubljana